Arnold Palmer Regional Airport  is in Westmoreland County, Pennsylvania, United States, two miles (3 km) southwest of Latrobe and about  southeast of Pittsburgh. It was formerly Westmoreland County Airport; it was renamed in September 1999 for Arnold Palmer as part of his 70th birthday celebration. Palmer learned to fly at the airport, and the dedication ceremony included Governor Tom Ridge and a flyover of three A-10s of the Pennsylvania Air National Guard.

The Federal Aviation Administration (FAA) National Plan of Integrated Airport Systems for 2017–2021 categorized it as a non-hub primary commercial service facility.

Passenger traffic at the airport has significantly grown since Spirit Airlines began serving the airport in 2011, jumping from roughly 10,000 passengers in 2010 to 310,000 passengers in 2019, a 3000% increase. Spirit Airlines is the only commercial passenger carrier and currently flies two nonstop routes to one city in Florida and one city in South Carolina from the airport.

History
The airport was served by Northwest Airlink, as a reliever for Pittsburgh International Airport on the other side of the Pittsburgh metropolitan area. The airport had regional service by US Airways to Pittsburgh International Airport, until the company's bankruptcy. Northwest/Delta ended its service to Detroit on July 31, 2009.

Federal Aviation Administration records say the airport had 18,946 passenger boardings (enplanements) in calendar year 2008, 15,482 in 2009 and 6,978 in 2010.

In February 2011 Spirit Airlines launched seasonal service to Fort Lauderdale and Myrtle Beach; in January 2012 Spirit announced they would start service to Orlando on May 17. The airline currently serves the airport year-round. Spirit now serves five cities from Arnold Palmer Regional Airport, and increased passenger traffic from 6,978 in 2010 to 355,910 in 2015. Southern Airways Express has expressed interest in a Latrobe-to-Pittsburgh route but no start date has been announced.

In January 2020, airport officials announced a $13 million project using federal grant money to widen the main runway to accommodate any size plane.

On September 3, 2020, President Donald Trump held a rally at the airport as part of his reelection campaign for the 2020 United States presidential election.

Facilities
The airport covers 945 acres (382 ha) at an elevation of 1,199 feet (365 m). It has one active asphalt runway: 6/24 is 8,222 by 100 feet (2,506 x 30 m). Runway 3/21 is closed indefinitely; it was 3,609 by 75 feet . Runway 6/24 was formerly 5/23.

In 2016 the airport had 28,816 aircraft operations, average 79 per day: 72% general aviation, 16% air taxi, 7% airline, and 5% military. In May 2017, 105 aircraft were based at the airport: 58 single-engine, 9 multi-engine, 33 jet, and 5 helicopter.

The airport has a terminal building with one baggage claim. Parking is free. Fixed-base operators (FBOs) on the field include L.J. Aviation and Vee Neal Aviation.

Future
Plans are underway to expand the airport's terminal building, which will double the size of the existing terminal to about 90,000 square feet. The proposed expansion would increase passenger space, offer more space for restaurants and services as well as a second security checkpoint. The expansion is estimated at $23 million.

Airlines and destinations

Statistics

References

External links

 Arnold Palmer Regional Airport, official site
 Arnold Palmer Airport, Flights Status, Arrivals, Departures
 Arnold Palmer Regional Airport at Pennsylvania DOT Bureau of Aviation
 Fixed-base operators: Vee Neal Aviation and L.J. Aviation
 Aerial image as of March 1995 from USGS The National Map
 
 

Airports in Pennsylvania
County airports in Pennsylvania
Transportation buildings and structures in Westmoreland County, Pennsylvania
Arnold Palmer
Latrobe, Pennsylvania